Mandapadu is a village in Guntur district of the Indian state of Andhra Pradesh. It is located in Medikonduru mandal of Guntur revenue division.

Geography 

Governance 

Mandapadu gram panchayat is the local self-government of the village. It is divided into wards and each ward is represented by a ward member. The village forms a part of Andhra Pradesh Capital Region and is under the jurisdiction of APCRDA.

Education 

As per the school information report for the academic year 2018–19, the village has a total of 6 schools. These include 3 Zilla Parishad/MPP and 3 private schools.

See also 
List of villages in Guntur district
Kutch Gurjar Kshatriyas contributions to the Indian railways

References 

Villages in Guntur district